Richard Bott (30 May 1900 in Bideford, Devonshire, England – 19 May 1980 in Watford, Hertfordshire, England) was an English skeleton racer who competed in the late 1940s. He finished sixth in the men's skeleton event at the 1948 Winter Olympics in St. Moritz.

References
1948 men's skeleton results
Wallechinsky, David (1984). "Skeleton (Cresta Run)". In The Complete Book of the Olympics: 1896 - 1980. New York: Penguin Books. p. 577.
Richard Bott's profile at Sports Reference.com

1900 births
1980 deaths
English male skeleton racers
Skeleton racers at the 1948 Winter Olympics
Olympic skeleton racers of Great Britain